Leptothrix ochracea is a bacterium from the genus Leptothrix. It  occurs in iron-rich fresh water and wetlands with only low concentrations  of organic matter.

References

Burkholderiales
Taxa named by Friedrich Traugott Kützing